Lazar Dobricz (1881–1970) was a Bulgarian circus artist, one of the first and most prominent circus performers of Bulgaria.

1881 births
1970 deaths
Bulgarian artists